2020–21 Eerste Klasse was an Eerste Klasse season. The teams were near-identical to the 2019–20 Eerste Klasse season, after the COVID-19 pandemic in the Netherlands caused the KNVB to decide that there would be no relegation and promotion following the previous season.  A few teams promoted anyway to the Hoofdklasse and Eerste Klasse. 

The league commenced on 22 August 2020 for the Saturday sections and 23 August for the Sunday sections and were curtailed on 24 February 2021, when the KNVB discontinued category A senior competitions in this season, including Eerste Klasse, again without promotion or relegation.

Saturday sections 
Participating clubs were:

A: West I 
 Amsterdamsche FC
 Argon
 BOL
 Die Haghe
 Forum Sport
 HEDW
 Honselersdijk
 Monnickendam
 Nootdorp
 VELO
 Valken '68
 Voorschoten '97
 ZOB
 Zwaluwen '30

B: West II 
 Brielle
 BVCB
 Heerjansdam
 Heinenoord
 Kloetinge
 Neptunus-Schiebroek
 Nieuw-Lekkerland
 Nieuwenhoorn
 Oranje Wit
 Papendrecht
 RVVH
 SHO
 Terneuzense Boys
 XerxesDZB

C: South 
 Almkerk
 De Bilt
 Breukelen
 GRC '14
 Huizen
 LRC
 Montfoort
 Nivo Sparta
 Roda '46
 Sliedrecht
 SVL
 WNC
 Woudenberg
 Zuidvogels

D: East 
 Bennekom
 CSV Apeldoorn
 DFS
 DOS '37
 DOS Kampen
 Ede
 DZC '68
 Kampen
 Hierden
 KHC
 Nunspeet
 Barneveld
 SVI
 SVZW

E: North 
 Balk
 Blauw Wit '34
 Broeksterwoude
 FC Burgum
 Drachten
 VV Groningen
 Leeuwarder Zwaluwen
 Olde Veste
 Oranje Nassau
 Pelikaan-S
 PKC '83
 WHC
 Winsum
 Zeerobben

Sunday sections 
Participating clubs were:

A: West I 
 AFC '34
 AGB
 Assendelft
 DSOV
 Fortuna Wormerveer
 Hillegom
 Hoofddorp
 Kampong
 Kolping Boys
 Legmeervogels
 LSVV
 ROAC
 Uitgeest
 SDZ

B: West II 
 Boshuizen
 DHC
 DOSKO
 Den Hoorn
 Hillegersberg
 Olympia
 ONA
 Rood Wit
 't Zand
 Sarto
 Spartaan '20
 Unitas '30
 VUC
 Zwervers

C: South I 
 Alverna
 Berghem
 Best
 Brabantia
 EFC
 FC Eindhoven AV
 Erp
 HVCH
 Leones
 SC NEC
 Nemelaer
 Rhode
 SV TOP
 Woezik

D: South II 
 Chevremont
 Deurne
 Geldrop
 Heeze
 Limburgia
 SSS '18
 De Ster
 Venray
 Susteren
 Venlo
 Veritas
 Wilhelmina '08
 Wittenhorst
 ZSV

E: East 
 De Bataven
 Bemmel
 BVC '12
 AVV Columbia
 Dalfsen
 Heino
 MASV
 RKHVV
 Raalte
 Stevo
 Tubantia
 TVC '28
 Voorwaarts Twello
 Winterswijk

F: North 
 FVC
 Germanicus
 Gomos
 GRC Groningen
 VV Heerenveen
 Hoogezand
 Jubbega
 Noordster
 Roden
 Sneek Wit Zwart
 Stadspark
 SVBO
 VKW
 WVV 1896

References 

Eerste Klasse seasons
Eerste Klasse
Netherlands
Netherlands